St. Eleutherius was a 6th-century Bishop of Auxerre in France and Pre-congregational Saint, who attended four Councils of Orléans between 533 and 549.

References

6th-century Frankish bishops
Bishops of Auxerre
Year of birth unknown
Year of death unknown